The Hong Kong women's national rugby union team represents Hong Kong in women's rugby union. They played their first international match in 1998 against Japan. They made their Rugby World Cup debut in 2017 in Ireland.

History
Hong Kong made their World Cup debut at the 2017 Women's Rugby World Cup. Hong Kong competed at the 2019 Asia Pacific Championship in Fiji. They played in a round-robin competition against Fiji and Samoa. They defeated Fiji 29–10 and lost to Samoa 34–12. Samoa won the Championship after beating Fiji 15–12.

They withdrew from the 2021 Rugby World Cup qualifier that was to be held in Dubai due to travel restrictions linked to the COVID-19 pandemic.

Hong Kong defeated Kazakhstan twice; they made a come back in the first test to win 31–17, and won the second test 14–12. They made a huge climb in rankings after jumping up four places from 18th to their current rank of 15th.

Records

Overall 

(Full internationals only)

Rugby World Cup

Squad
23-player squad that faced Kazakhstan in a two-match series on the 10th and 17th December 2022:

Previous squads

References

External links
Official website

Asian national women's rugby union teams
Rugby union in Hong Kong
Hong Kong rugby union teams
W

fr:Équipe de Hong Kong de rugby à XV